Myzus is a genus of true bugs belonging to the family Aphididae.

The genus has cosmopolitan distribution. Its original distribution is the Old World.

Species:
 Myzus ajugae Schouteden, 1903 
 Myzus amygdalinus (Nevsky, 1928)

References

Aphididae